Belinda Bencic was the defending champion, but chose to compete in Houston instead.

Luksika Kumkhum won the title, defeating Sabine Lisicki 6–1, 6–3 in the final.

Seeds

Main draw

Finals

Top half

Bottom half

Qualifying

Seeds

Qualifiers

Lucky losers

Qualifying draw

First qualifier

Second qualifier

Third qualifier

Fourth qualifier

References 
 Main draw
 Qualifying draw

OEC Taipei WTA Challenger - Singles
Taipei WTA Ladies Open